Maurice Lefebvre (23 July 1888 – 6 April 1965) was a Belgian footballer. He played in one match for the Belgium national football team in 1909.

References

External links
 

1888 births
1965 deaths
Belgian footballers
Belgium international footballers
Place of birth missing
Association footballers not categorized by position